The World Wushu Championships (WWC) is an international sports championship hosted by the International Wushu Federation (IWUF) for the sports of wushu taolu and sanda (sanshou). It has been held biennially since 1991 and is the pinnacle event of the IWUF. The World Wushu Championships also coincides with the IWUF Congress as well as with various committee meetings. This competition additionally serves as the qualification event for the Taolu World Cup and the Sanda World Cup.

Championships

History
Starting in 1985, the Chinese Wushu Association began to host the International Invitational Wushu Championships as a ways of standardizing the sport of wushu on a global scale. After the formation of the IWUF at the 1990 Asian Games in Beijing, the 1991 World Wushu Championships were quickly organized to be held in the same city. With the desire of reaching a wider global audience and to achieve recognition by the International Olympic Committee, the 3rd and 4th world championships were organized in the United States and Italy, the first major international wushu competitions outside of Asia. At the 6th WWC in 2001, the competition administered doping tests for the first time. 

The 2021 WWC was rescheduled to 2023 as a result of the COVID-19 pandemic.

Addition of events 
The 1st WWC consisted of changquan, daoshu, jianshu, gunshu, qiangshu, nanquan, taijiquan, and men's sanda (originally called sanshou). Starting in 1993, the IWUF compulsory routines were to be used in taolu competition. In 1999, taijijian, nandao, and nangun were added. That same year, the second set of compulsory routines were approved, and thus in the 2001 WWC, the old and new compulsory routine events were held simultaneously. During the next rendition in 2003, duilian and women's sanda were added. Due to the major taolu rules revision in 2005 which introduced a new scoring system, compulsory routines were discontinued that year. The following rendition in 2007 introduced incidental music for taijiquan and taijijian events.

In 2013 after the ratification of the third set of compulsory routines, additional events for compulsory changquan, nanquan, and taijiquan were held at the WWC that year as well as in 2015. The 2015 WWC also introduced traditional events: men's xingyiquan and dadao, and women's baguazhang and shuangjian. These traditional events would reappear at the 2017 and 2019 renditions though men's dadao was replaced with suangdao. Also in 2019, the competition consisted of a creative group-set (jiti) event with certified and celebrity judges. The official judges graded performances out of a total of 10.000 according to regular IWUF judging procedures and celebrity judges gave a score out of 10.000 based on personal preference, and the medals for this event were not officially counted as part of the overall medal count.

All-time medal table
Last updated after the 2019 World Wushu Championships.

The sum total of gold, silver and bronze medals are not equal for the following reasons:

 Sanda events changed from awarding one bronze medal to two bronze medals per event in 1993.
 Occasional none-awarding or sharing of prizes.
 The 1995 rendition had several winners per each prize in taolu events while sanda events only awarded a gold medal to the winner of each event.
 Stripped medals are taken into account in the table above.

Statistics

Multiple gold medalists

Taolu

Sanda

Multiple medalists

Taolu

See also 
 List of international wushu competitions
World Junior Wushu Championships

References

External links 

 
Wushu competitions
World championships in combat sports
Recurring sporting events established in 1991